Grindrod Bank (GRDB) is a commercial bank in South Africa. It is licensed as a "locally-controlled financial institution" by the South African Reserve Bank, the national banking regulator.

Overview
GRDB is a large financial services provider in South Africa, based on assets. It currently employs ninety six(96) people as of 2011. The bank's total asset base was in excess of US$550 million (ZAR:3.7 billion), with shareholders' equity in excess of US$37 million (ZAR:250 million).

History
The bank was established in 1994 as a subsidiary of Grindrod Limited. The bank maintains headquarters in Durban, with offices in Johannesburg, Pretoria and Cape Town. In 2006, it acquired 100% of the assets of Marriott Merchant Bank. Grindrod Bank focuses on meeting the needs of high-net-worth individuals, large corporations and institutions.

Ownership
As of January 2020, Grindrod Bank is 100% owned by Grindrod Financial Holdings.  Grindrod Financial Holdings is 96.83% held by Grindrod Limited. 

Grindrod Limited is the holding company of a dynamic organisation listed on the Johannesburg Stock Exchange, under the symbol: GND. The two business divisions are namely, Freight Services and Financial Services. With more than 100 years experience in South Africa's logistics, transportation, freight movement and related industries.

Branch network
, Grindrod Bank maintains a branch network in the cities of Johannesburg, Durban, Pretoria and Cape Town at the following locations:

 Durban Head Office & Branch - 1st Floor North, 20 Kingsmead Boulevard, Kingsmead Office Park, Durban
 Johannesburg Branch - 4th Floor, Grindrod Tower, 8a Protea Place, Sandton, Johannesburg  
 Pretoria Branch - 1st Floor, Building 21, Oxford Office Park, 3 Bauhinia Street, Centurion, Pretoria
 Cape Town Branch - 3rd floor, The Terraces, 25 Protea Road, Claremont, Cape Town

Acquisition by African Bank
In May 2022, South African media reported that African Bank had offered ZAR:1.5 billion (approx. USD:97 million) to acquire Grindrod Bank and its holding company Grindrod Financial Holdings. The deal requires both shareholder and regulatory approvals.

External links
  Website of Grindrod Bank
  Website of Reserve Bank of South Africa

See also

List of banks in South Africa
Reserve Bank of South Africa
Economy of South Africa

References

Banks of South Africa
Companies based in Durban
Banks established in 1994
1994 establishments in South Africa